Phospho.ELM is a database storing the phosphorylation data extracted from the literature and the  analyses.

References

External links
 http://phospho.elm.eu.org

Biological databases
Post-translational modification
Phosphorus